Andrei Borissov (born 1 August 1969 in Tallinn, Estonia) is an Estonian football coach and former professional footballer. He played the position of midfielder and is 1.77 m tall and weighs 76 kg. Borissov is the former member of the Estonia national football team, with 14 caps to his name.

From 2009 Borissov has been acting as a playing coach in Ajax Lasnamäe, FC Infonet, Tartu SK 10 and Maardu Linnameeskond, mostly in Esiliiga. In August 2018, According to the reports, Borissov was selected as the best coach in June and July.

References

External links
 
 
 Borissov hakkab Infoneti juhendajaks 

1969 births
Footballers from Tallinn
Living people
Soviet footballers
Estonian footballers
Estonian people of Russian descent
Estonia international footballers
Meistriliiga players
Veikkausliiga players
KSK Vigri Tallinn players
FC Norma Tallinn players
FC Lantana Tallinn players
FF Jaro players
FC TVMK players
FC Ajax Lasnamäe players
Expatriate footballers in Finland
Estonian expatriate sportspeople in Finland
Estonian expatriate footballers
FCI Tallinn managers
Association football midfielders
Estonian football managers
Maardu Linnameeskond players